Roselina Angee (born 12 August 1958) is a Colombian former swimmer. She competed in five events at the 1972 Summer Olympics.

References

External links
 

1958 births
Living people
Colombian female swimmers
Olympic swimmers of Colombia
Swimmers at the 1972 Summer Olympics
Place of birth missing (living people)
20th-century Colombian women